Pandavar Illam  is a 2019 Indian-Tamil language Family drama television series, which premiered on 15 July 2019 in Sun TV and digitally streams on Sun NXT. It stars Papri Ghosh, Aarthi Subhash, Krithika Annamalai, Naresh Eswar, Guhan Shanmugam, Nesan Nepolean, Surendar Raaj, Mohammad Absar, Anisha and Tanisha Kuppanda. The show is produced by VSAGA Pictures Pvt Ltd and directed by O.N. Rathnam.

Synopsis 
The huge ancestral house of Periya Sundaram and his five grandsons, Raja Sundaram Pandavar, Nalla Sundaram Pandavar, Azhagu Sundaram Pandavar, Anbu Sundaram Pandavar and Kutty Sundaram Pandavar, is strictly barred for women. This 'only men' family take a vow against marriage, after losing their elder brother, Shiva Sundaram Pandavar on the day of his wedding. On the other hand, a district level boxer Mrs. Kayal has her heart set on marrying Kutty Sundaram. The sequences continued with the marriage of all the other brothers, after the marriage of Kutty Sundaram, Rasu and Anbu Sundaram gets married. Then, they plan to do marriage for Azhagu Sundaram who is having two choices of marrying either Thenu (sister of Kayal) or Rani (cousin of Revathy). Finally after a lot of struggles, Azhagu Sundaram marries Thenmozhi. Then, the Grandfather of Pandavas (Periya Sundaram) goes to a pilgrimage trip to Kasi in North India. Then, the daughter in laws of the house, introduce Maheshwari to Nalla Sundaram as his cooking assistant and student. Slowly, they try to make Nalla and maze to get closer but a new character comes into picture, who is Manimegalai alias Roshini (A national level shooter and a boxer). Nalla Sundaram starts liking her and they got married. Due to which all the Pandavas lose their house due to an agreement that if Nalla is not marrying Maheshwari then the Pandavas should give their house. So, these people after giving their house, comes to the city of Chennai. Now they start living there happily but also with few problems happening in a normal joint family and now Kayal and Roshini are pregnant. The rest forms the crust of the story.

Cast

Main  
 Delhi Kumar as Periya Sundaram Pandavar; The Head of the Pandavas family; Siva, Raja, Nalla, Azhagu, Anbu and Kutty's grandfather.
 as Selaiar Peiyevar Siva Sundaram Pandavar Siva: Raja, Nalla, Azhagu, Anbu, Kutty's elder brothers Pandavas family.
 Nesan Nepolean as Raja Sundaram Pandavar Raja,Rasu: eldest son Pandavas family; Revathy's husband.
 Krithika Annamalai as Revathy Sree Raja Sundaram: Raja Sundaram Pandavar's wife and Rani's best friend.
 Mohammed Absar as Nalla Sundaram Pandavar Nalla: second son Pandavas family Roshini's husband.
 Anu Sulash replacement Tanisha Kuppanda as Manimegalai Nalla Sundaram Roshini: Nalla Sundaram Pandavar's wife. 
 Surendar Raaj as Azhagu Sundaram Pandavar Azhagu: third son Pandavas family; Thenmozhi's husband.
 Shyleshwari Imran replacement Madhumitha Ilayaraja replacement Anisha as Thenmozhi Azhagu Sundaram: Azhagu Sundaram Pandavar's wife and Kayalvizhi's younger sister.
 Guhan Shanmugam as Anbu Sundaram Pandavar Anbu: fourth son Pandavas family; Malliga's husband.
 Aarthi Subhash as Malliga Anbu Sundaram: Anbu Sundaram Pandavar's wife.
 Naresh Eswar as Kutty Sundaram Pandavar Kutty: KadaiKutty younger son, Pandavas family; Kayal's husband.
 Papri Ghosh as Kayalvizhi Kutty Sundaram: Kutty Sundaram Pandavar's wife.

Recurring 
 Magima as Sivagami: Revathy's mother.
 Sonia replacement Swetha as Annapost Mullai Kodi Athiveerapandian: Kayalvizhi and Thenu's mother.
 Bharathi Kannan as Athi Veera Pandian: Kayalvizhi and Thenu's father. 
 David Solomon Raja as Kodeeshwaran; Roshini's father. 
 Premalatha as Saroja; Roshini's mother.
 Kathadi Ramamurthy as Mandhiramoorthy; Revathy's grandfather.
 S. N. Parvathy as Pattammal; Kayalvizhi and Thenu's grandmother.
 Hema Srikanth as Kokila Vishwanathan: Maheswari's mother.
 Rani as Vedhanayaki; arch-rival of Pandavas family.
 Anushiya Elakiya as Maheswari "Mahesh"; Nalla Sundaram Pandavar's ex-fiancée and Roshini's arch-rival. 
 Tharshika Dinesh as Deivarani "Rani"; Azhagu Sundaram Pandavar's ex-love interest and Revathy's cousin. 
 Vijay Krishnaraj as Velan; Malliga and Shenbagam's father. (died in serial)
 K. S. Jayalakshmi as Valli Velan; Malliga and Shenbagam's mother.
 Swapna Sharath as Shenbagam Shanmugam; Shanmugam's wife, Valli and Velan's daughter and Malliga's sister.
 Revathy Shankar as Deivanayagi Jameen Amma: Vedhanayaki's mother.
 Raja Senthil as Velu; Vedhanayaki's brother.
 Sudha as Selvi Velu: Velu's wife.

Guest 
 Sonia Agarwal
 Raaghav

Adaptations

References

External links 
 

Sun TV original programming
2019 Tamil-language television series debuts
Television shows set in Tamil Nadu
Tamil-language television soap operas
Tamil-language melodrama television series